Mateusz Michalski (born 29 August 1987) is a visually impaired sprinter from Poland. He competed at the 2008, 2012 and 2016 Paralympics and won a gold in the 200 metres and a silver in the 100 metres in 2012. His time of 21.56 s in the 200 m set a new world record.

Career history
Michalski was born in Września, Poland in 1987. He is visually impaired, and describes his vision as being about ten percent. He took up athletics at the age of 16, after a coach at his school introduced him to the sport.

In 2008, Michalski travelled to Beijing as part of the Polish team to compete in the Summer Paralympics. At the games he competed in both 100m and 200m sprint events. In the 100m Michalski progressed through the first round, but finished 9th in the semifinal, failing to reach the finals. In the 200m he reached the finals, finishing eighth in a time of 22.75 seconds.

Michalski's first major international success came at the 2011 IPC Athletics World Championships in Christchurch, New Zealand. There he won both the 100m and 200m gold in the T12 category. The next year he competed in the 2012 IPC Athletics European Championships in Stadskanaal, racing in the 100m – T12. In the final he beat Russia's Fedor Trikolich to take the European title. Two months later he competed at the 2012 Summer Paralympics in London. In the 100m Michalski progressed through to the finals, but was beaten into second place by Trikoli. In the 200m he was placed into qualifier Heat 3 alongside Trikoli. In the heat he recorded a season's best of 22.13 to go through to the semi-finals in first place. Trikoli also qualified after recording a personal best, going through to the semis as one of the fastest losers. The two rivals met again in the semifinals in heat 2. Michalski recorded another season's beat with an improved time of 22.09, but this was not enough to beat Trikoli who produced another personal best to finish in 21.94. Michalski's time saw him qualify through to the final in the only fastest loser's position at the expense of Yang Yuqing of China, who recorded a time of 22.30 in the first heat. The final, held on 8 September, saw Michalski run the 200m in a time of 21.56 setting a new world record, leaving Trikoli with the silver.

His achievements in London saw Michalski named Disabled Athlete of the year at the 2013 Polish Sportspersonality of the Year on 11 January.

Awards and honours
He received the Cross of Merit from the president of Poland in 2013.

References

1987 births
Living people
People from Września
Polish male sprinters
Paralympic athletes of Poland
Athletes (track and field) at the 2008 Summer Paralympics
Athletes (track and field) at the 2012 Summer Paralympics
Athletes (track and field) at the 2016 Summer Paralympics
Paralympic gold medalists for Poland
Paralympic silver medalists for Poland
World record holders in Paralympic athletics
Medalists at the 2012 Summer Paralympics
Sportspeople from Greater Poland Voivodeship
Recipients of the Cross of Merit (Poland)
Medalists at the World Para Athletics Championships
Medalists at the World Para Athletics European Championships
Paralympic medalists in athletics (track and field)
Paralympic sprinters
Visually impaired sprinters